Bowes is a village in County Durham, England.

Bowes may also refer to:

People
 Bowes (surname), a surname

Places
Australia
 Bowes, Western Australia
United States
 Bowes, Illinois, unincorporated community in Plato Township, Kane County, Illinois, United States
 Bowes, West Virginia, unincorporated community in Greenbrier County, West Virginia, United States

Other uses
 Bowes Primary School, a primary school in London
 Bowes Railway, the world's only preserved operational standard gauge cable railway system
 Bowes railway station, a North East England railway station
 Bowes Station, a pastoral lease in Western Australia

See also
 Bowe
 Bowes & Bowes
 Bowes Castle
 Bowes Museum
 Bowes Park, Greater London
 Bowes-Lyon
 Bow (disambiguation)
 Bowles (disambiguation)